Harry Gersh (December 1, 1912 – July 30, 2001) was an American writer and historian. He was the oldest known student ever to enroll as a freshman at Harvard College. Before enrolling in school he was a writer for over 50 years.

He served in the United States Navy during World War II.

He died on July 30, 2001 in Columbia, Maryland.

Bibliography
 Laughter of Israel (196?)
 Minority Report (1961)
 Women who made America great (1962)
 The Sacred Books of the Jews – Page 1 (1968)
 When a Jew Celebrates (1971)
 Mishnah: The Oral Law (1984)
 Midrash: Rabbinic Lore (1985)
 Talmud: Law and Commentary (1986)
 Kabbalah (1989)

References

1912 births
2001 deaths
People from Martha's Vineyard, Massachusetts
Writers from New York City
People from Columbia, Maryland
20th-century American Jews
Judaic scholars
United States Navy personnel of World War II
Harvard College alumni
Historians from Massachusetts
Historians from New York (state)
Historians from Maryland